Begoña Villacís Sánchez (born 4 November 1977) is a Spanish lawyer and politician who currently serves as deputy mayor of Madrid in the government of Mayor Martínez-Almeida. She has been serving as councillor and Spokesperson of Citizens Group of the City Council of Madrid.

Biography 
Villacís was born in Madrid in 1977 and her first studies were on La Salle de San Rafael charter school. She lived in Virginia, U.S. between 1992 and 1995. She obtained her degree on law in 2000 by CEU San Pablo University and in 2002 she obtained a Master in Tax Advice and Tax Law by the Comillas Pontifical University. According to her, she decided to be a lawyer while watching the movie 12 Angry Men of Sidney Lumet.

In June 2003, she became responsible for the Tax, Labour and Commercial Law Areas at Legalitas, a law firm in Spain.

As an analyst of legal issues, she regularly collaborated in well-known television shows such as Amigas y conocidas, El gato al agua, España Directo and La mañana de La 1. It was precisely at a television gathering, where she met the Citizens Party President Albert Rivera. A voter of Citizens, Villacís began to collaborate with the party in September 2014, advising on local taxes, and she finally joined the party in early 2015. In February 2015 she held a meeting with far-right party Vox, where the later party offered her a position in the list for the 2015 regional election to the Assembly of Madrid but she preferred to maintain the commitment to Citizens. That same month, she ran as a pre-candidate in the Citizens' primary process to determine the party's Mayoral candidate for Madrid. She imposed over the other pre-candidate, Jaime Trabuchelli, commanding 60% of the votes.

The Citizens list for the May 2015 Madrid municipal election headed by Villacís obtained 7 councillors. She could not vote for herself because, at that time, she was a registered dweller in Villanueva del Pardillo. During the 2015–2019 Madrid City Council' meeting she acted as Spokesperson of her political group.

She renovated her seat for the period 2019–2023 in the 26 May 2019 municipal election. Her list won 11 seats, 4 up from the 7 seats obtained in 2011. Her party and the far-right Vox endorsed the conservative candidate Martínez-Almeida in the investiture vote that took place during the opening session of the new council on 15 June 2019. As part of the investiture agreement Villacís became First Deputy Mayor (and Vice-Mayor).

References 

1977 births
Spanish women in politics
Citizens (Spanish political party) politicians
Madrid city councillors (2015–2019)
First deputy mayors of Madrid
Madrid city councillors (2019–2023)
Living people